Edward Fidoe (born 10 May 1978) is former British actor, best known for playing Eric in Central's children's television series Woof! from 1989 to 1993. As an adult he has run a theatre production company with playwright Matt Charman, worked as a consultant at McKinsey & Company and co-founded School 21 an all-through school that opened in September 2012 in Stratford, East London.

References

1978 births
Living people
British male television actors